Aqar may refer to:
 Aqar-e Olya
 Aqar-e Sofla